The Chamberlin (or Chamberlain)  Mill Covered Bridge, also called Chamberlin Covered Bridge or Whitcomb Covered Bridge, is a historic covered bridge that carries Chamberlain Bridge Road across the South Wheelock Branch of the Passumpsic River in Lyndon, Vermont.  Built in 1881, it is one of five similar area bridges.  It was listed on the National Register of Historic Places in 1974.

Description and history
The Chamberlin Mill Covered Bridge is located in a rural-residential area of south-central Lyndon, carrying Chamberlain Bridge Road, a north-south connector between York Street and South Wheelock Road west of United States Route 5. It is covered by a metal gabled roof with very long eaves, and rests on stone abutments. Vertical boarding is applied to the lower third of its sides, and also to the portal ends. The portals project beyond the trusses, and their sheathing is flared at sides to reach the eaves. The trusses include iron suspension rods, and are joined at the top by lateral tie rods for stability. The bridge deck consists of wooden planking.

The bridge's construction date is unknown.  It was mentioned in a newspaper in 1881, at which time discussion was ongoing whether or not to cover it, suggesting it was originally built without a roof.  The bridge is one of five surviving 19th-century covered bridges in Lyndon, all of which exhibit similar construction features.  A sixth bridge in adjacent Danville also has similar features.

See also
National Register of Historic Places listings in Caledonia County, Vermont
List of Vermont covered bridges
List of bridges on the National Register of Historic Places in Vermont

References

External links
Chamberlin Mill Covered Bridge at BridgeHunter.com

Bridges completed in 1881
Covered bridges on the National Register of Historic Places in Vermont
Buildings and structures in Lyndon, Vermont
Queen post truss bridges in the United States
Covered bridges in Caledonia County, Vermont
National Register of Historic Places in Caledonia County, Vermont
Road bridges on the National Register of Historic Places in Vermont
Wooden bridges in Vermont
1881 establishments in Vermont